Arphy is a commune in the Gard department in southern France.

Geography

Climate

Arphy has a oceanic climate (Köppen climate classification Cfb) closely bordering on a warm-summer Mediterranean climate (Csb).

Population

See also
Communes of the Gard department

References

Communes of Gard